Mag Earwhig! is the 10th studio album by American indie rock band Guided by Voices. Following the dissolution of the group's "classic" lineup, band-leader Robert Pollard recruited Cleveland group Cobra Verde as his backing band, while retaining the Guided by Voices name. It was the second release to feature future long-term collaborator Doug Gillard. Gillard had previously played on and co-wrote the song "Mice Feel Nice (In My Room)" on the Tigerbomb EP. Most of Mag Earwhig! was recorded in a professional studio in Cleveland by the new lineup and marked a departure from band's trademark lo-fi sound; additional songs were also recorded in Dayton, Ohio.

Track listing 
All songs written by Robert Pollard unless otherwise noted.
 "Can't Hear the Revolution" – 1:36
 "Sad If I Lost It" – 3:10
 "I Am a Tree" (Doug Gillard) – 4:40
 "The Old Grunt" – 1:28
 "Bulldog Skin" – 2:59
 "Are You Faster?" (Jim Pollard, R. Pollard, Tobin Sprout) – 1:13
 "I Am Produced" (R. Pollard, Sprout) – 1:06
 "Knock 'Em Flyin'" – 1:52
 "Not Behind the Fighter Jet" – 2:13
 "Choking Tara" – 1:24
 "Hollow Cheek" – :32
 "Portable Men's Society" – 4:16
 "Little Lines" – 2:02
 "Learning to Hunt" – 2:24
 "The Finest Joke Is Upon Us" – 3:08
 "Mag Earwhig!" – :39
 "Now to War" – 2:44
 "Jane of the Waking Universe" – 2:25
 "The Colossus Crawls West" – 2:13
 "Mute Superstar" – 1:24
 "Bomb in the Bee-Hive" – 2:03

Personnel

Guided by Voices 

 Robert Pollard – vocals, electric guitar, acoustic guitar, piano, lead guitar (tracks 6, 15), drums (track 1), casio (tracks 1, 2)
 Doug Gillard – electric guitar, acoustic guitar, nylon-string guitar, backing vocals, bass, lead guitar (tracks 3, 5, 12, 17, 20, 21)
John Petkovic – electric guitar, synthesizer, backing vocals, lead guitar (track 13)
Don Depew – electric guitar, bass, synthesizer, organ, backing vocals
Dave Swanson – drums, maracas, backing vocals

Additional musicians 

 Tobin Sprout – bass, slide guitar (track 18); backing vocals (tracks 1, 18), lead guitar (track 6), acoustic guitar, Casio (track 7); drums (track 6)
Jim Pollard – bass, guitar (track 6); casio (tracks 1, 4)
Mitch Mitchell – bass (tracks 9, 12, 13, 20), guitar (track 18)
Kevin Fennell – drums (tracks 8, 15, 18)
Joe Buben – drums (tracks 2)
John Shough a.k.a. Johnny Strange – bass (tracks 2, 14, 15), programming (tracks 2, 14)
Chad Stanisic – organ (track 5)

References 

1997 albums
Guided by Voices albums
Matador Records albums